In some accounts, Aulestes was the brother of Ocnus.  He was said to have founded Perusia.

References

Characters in Greek mythology